The 469th Flying Training Squadron is part of the 80th Flying Training Wing and is based at Sheppard Air Force Base, Texas.

History

World War II
Established as a B-24 Liberator heavy bomb squadron in 1942. Mission was as an Operational Training Unit (OTU) under Second Air Force training B-24 replacement pilots and aircrew.  Inactivated in 1944 when B-24 Liberator crew training was ended.

Korean War era
Reactivated in 1952 as an Air Defense Command Fighter-Interceptor squadron during the Korean War.  Squadron initially absorbed personnel, aircraft and equipment of several National Guard fighter-interceptor squadrons when they were relieved from active federal service. Provided Air Defense over Eastern Tennessee, specifically over the Atomic Energy Commission Oak Ridge facilities and numerous Aluminum production facilities in the Knoxville area.   Converted to F-86s in 1953 and was operationally ready by July 1953. Utilized all major modifications of the F-86, including the "L" model. Participated in numerous actual and simulated exercises to test alert status and combat readiness until inactivation in 1958.

Vietnam service
Activated again in 1962 as a Tactical Air Command fighter squadron at George AFB, California.  Equipped with F-105 Thunderchiefs, but remained unmanned from July 1962 through June 1963. Operational in February 1964, temporarily deployed overseas from November 1964 to March 1965, first to Yokota AB, Japan, to augment the 41st Air Division, and then to Kadena AB, Okinawa, in support of the 18th Tactical Fighter Wing.

Reassigned in November 1965 permanently to Thailand, where it prepared for combat fighter operations at Korat RTAFB. Engaged in combat operations over Indochina from November 1965 until inactivated in October 1972, flying F-105s and, after 1968, it flew F-4s.

By January 1969, proliferating antiaircraft defenses in the Barrel Roll area in the Kingdom of Laos were making operations ever riskier for Slow FACs such as the Raven FACs. The concept of stationing FACs at the same base with their strike aircraft was bruited. Volunteers from the 469th Tactical Fighter Squadron were approved for Fast FAC duty under the call sign "Tiger" in February. The inertial guidance systems in their fresh F-4E Phantom IIs would prove consequential for piloting and target location in an environment largely lacking in aerial navigation aids, especially after the 1 March loss of the only TACAN site in northern Laos. On 17 March, the volunteer FACs began supplying the necessary tactical air power for General Vang Pao's Hmong guerrillas to sweep through Operation Raindance. In April, the "Tigers" were considered for night FAC duties, but rejected. By July, the "Tiger" FACs were so immersed in directing close air support, they were allotted four sorties per day. Between July and September 1969, the "Tigers" were credited with 34 enemy killed by air, 12 antiaircraft sites destroyed, 246 interdictory road cuts of enemy supply lines, 15 enemy supply trucks destroyed, 403 structures destroyed, 360 fires caused by explosions, and 681 secondary explosions of munitions and fuel. They accomplished this during 182 FAC missions, during which they directed 2,004 air strikes. In turn, the "Tigers" suffered five F-4E's severely damaged by enemy fire.

21st century
The 469th Flying Training Squadron was reactivated in April 2009 as part of the 80th Flying Training Wing to conduct undergraduate flying training for EURO-NATO pilot candidates. The 469 Flying Training Squadron is composed of approximately 60 multinational personnel representing 13 signatory NATO nations supporting Euro-NATO Joint Jet Pilot Training. The squadron employs 46 T-38 aircraft flying over 11,500 training sorties and 13,000 hours while providing undergraduate, pilot instructor and continuation training for over 200 student pilots and instructor trainees annually.

Lineage
 469th Bombardment Squadron
 Constituted as the 469th Bombardment Squadron on 1 July 1942
 Activated 15 July 1942
 Inactivated 1 April 1944
 Consolidated with the 469th Tactical Fighter Squadron as the 469th Tactical Fighter Squadron on 19 September 1985

 469th Flying Training Squadron
 Constituted as the 469th Fighter-Interceptor Squadron on 10 October 1952
 Activated on 1 December 1952
 Inactivated 8 January 1958
 Redesignated 469th Tactical Fighter Squadron and activated on 13 April 1962 (not organized)
 Organized on 8 July 1962
 Inactivated 31 October 1972
 Consolidated with the 469th Bombardment Squadron on 19 September 1985
 Redesignated 469th Flying Training Squadron on 25 February 2009
 Activated on 10 April 2009

Assignments
 333d Bombardment Group, 15 July 1942 – 1 April 1944
 516th Air Defense Group, 13 April 1952
 355th Fighter Group, 18 August 1955 – 8 January 1958
 Tactical Air Command, 13 April 1962 (not organized)
 355th Tactical Fighter Wing, 8 July 1962 – 8 November 1965
 6234th Tactical Fighter Wing, 8 November 1965
 388th Tactical Fighter Wing, 8 April 1966 – 31 October 1972
 80th Operations Group, 20 April 2009 – present

Stations
 Topeka Army Air Field, Kansas, 15 July 1942
 Dalhart Army Air Field, Texas, 22 February 1943 – 1 April 1944
 McGhee Tyson Air Force Base, Tennessee, 13 April 1952 – 8 January 1958
 George Air Force Base, California, 13 April 1962
 McConnell Air Force Base, Kansas, 21 July 1964 – October 1965
 Korat Royal Thai Air Force Base, Thailand, 8 November 1965 – 31 October 1972
 Sheppard Air Force Base, Texas, 10 April 2009 – present

Aircraft
 Consolidated B-24 Liberator, 1942–1944
 Republic F-47 Thunderbolt, 1952
 North American F-86D Sabre, 1953–1958
 Republic F-105 Thunderchief, 1962–1968
 McDonnell F-4 Phantom II, 1968–1972
 Northrop T-38C Talon, 2009–present

References

 Notes

Bibliography

 
 
 
 .
 .

External links

Military units and formations in Texas
0469